Choqluy-e Sofla (also Romanized as Choqlūy-e Soflá; also known as Chaghalū-ye Pā’īn, Chaghalū-ye Soflá, Chaghlooy Sofla, Chonglu Pāīn, Choqlū-ye Soflá, Chūqlū-ye Soflá, and Jaghalū-ye Soflá) is a village in Qeshlaqat-e Afshar Rural District, Afshar District, Khodabandeh County, Zanjan Province, Iran. At the 2006 census, its population was 225, in 48 families.

References 

Populated places in Khodabandeh County